'Summer Wind' is a song written by Chris Hillman and Steve Hill, and recorded by American country music group The Desert Rose Band. It was released in July 1988 as the first single from the album Running. The song reached number 2 on the Billboard Hot Country Singles & Tracks chart, just behind "Darlene" by T. Graham Brown.

Charts

Weekly charts

Year-end charts

References

1988 singles
The Desert Rose Band songs
Songs written by Chris Hillman
Song recordings produced by Paul Worley
MCA Records singles
Curb Records singles
1988 songs